The 2022 ICF Canoe Marathon World Championships was held from 29 September to 2 October 2022 in Ponte de Lima, Portugal. Also in Para Marathon for first time and Masters.

Schedule
All times are local time (Central European Summer Time).

Medalists

Senior

Senior short race

Under-23

Junior

Masters

Para

Medal table

References

External links
Results

ICF Canoe Marathon World Championships
World Championships
2022 in Portuguese sport
International sports competitions hosted by Portugal
Canoeing in Portugal
ICF
ICF